Count Louis Raphaël Cahen d'Anvers (24 May 1837 – 20 December 1922) was a French banker.

Born in 1837 as the son of Meyer Joseph Cahen d'Anvers and Clara Bischoffsheim (1810-1876), he was a scion of two wealthy Jewish banking families. He married Louise de Morpurgo, of an also wealthy Sephardi Jewish family from Trieste. Two of their daughters, Alice (1876–1965) and Elisabeth (1874–1944 KZ Auschwitz), were painted by Pierre-Auguste Renoir in Pink and Blue in 1881. Alice married Major General Sir Charles Townshend and was the grandmother of Belgian-American journalist Arnaud de Borchgrave.

A third daughter, Irène (1872 -1963) was also the subject of a Renoir painting entitled Little Irène. Louis was so dissatisfied with the painting that he hung it in the servants' quarters and delayed payment of only 1500 francs. Irene married Moïse de Camondo in 1891 and divorced in 1902.

During the Nazi occupation of France, Irène survived by escaping to a villa in the south of France. Her daughter, Béatrice was murdered in the Auschwitz concentration camp.

References

1837 births
1922 deaths
Belgian Jews
Jewish bankers
Belgian bankers
French bankers
Belgian emigrants to France
Belgian people of German-Jewish descent
French people of German-Jewish descent
Louis